W. D. Chappelle Jr. (October 19, 1888 – March 7, 1957) was an American physician and surgeon in South Carolina who opened the People’s Infirmary, a hospital and surgery practice for African Americans  in Columbia, South Carolina in 1914. At the time, segregation prevented many African Americans from having access to healthcare.

He graduated with his M.D. from Leonard Medical College at Shaw University in 1913. He received his medical license in 1914, one of the 18 out of 44 applicants who passed.

W. D. Chappelle was his father. He is comedian Dave Chappelle's grand-uncle.

References

1888 births
1957 deaths
20th-century American physicians
Physicians from South Carolina
20th-century surgeons
American surgeons
20th-century African-American physicians